Podalonia is a genus of parasitoidal wasps in the family Sphecidae.

The genus is present worldwide with the exception of South America. These wasps are similar to the related sand wasps (Ammophila), but they have a much shorter petiole and the abdomen is slightly stronger. The thorax bears a small white patch. 

The females lay their nests in the sand. They normally incubate in large, hairless caterpillars of moths (Noctuidae).

Species 
This genus includes about 66 species:

Podalonia affinis (W. Kirby, 1798)
Podalonia afghanica Balthasar, 1957
Podalonia albohirsuta (Tsuneki, 1971)
Podalonia alpina (Kohl, 1888)
Podalonia altaiensis (Tsuneki, 1971)
Podalonia andrei (F. Morawitz, 1889)
Podalonia argentifrons (Cresson, 1865)
Podalonia argentipilis (Provancher, 1887)
Podalonia aspera (Christ, 1791)
Podalonia atriceps (F. Smith, 1856)
Podalonia atrocyanea (Eversmann, 1849)
Podalonia caerulea Murray, 1940
Podalonia canescens (Dahlbom, 1843)
Podalonia caucasica (Mocsáry, 1883)
Podalonia chalybea (Kohl, 1906)
Podalonia clypeata Murray, 1940
Podalonia compacta Fernald, 1927
Podalonia dispar (Taschenberg, 1869)
Podalonia ebenina (Spinola, 1839)
Podalonia erythropus (F. Smith, 1856)
Podalonia fera (Lepeletier de Saint Fargeau, 1845)
Podalonia flavida (Kohl, 1901)
Podalonia gobiensis (Tsuneki, 1971)
Podalonia gulussa (Morice, 1900)
Podalonia harveyi (de Beaumont, 1967)
Podalonia hirsuta (Scopoli, 1763)
Podalonia hirsutaffinis (Tsuneki, 1971)
Podalonia hirticeps (Cameron, 1889)
Podalonia kansuana Li & Yang, 1992
Podalonia kaszabi (Tsuneki, 1971)
Podalonia kozlovii (Kohl, 1906)
Podalonia luctuosa (F. Smith, 1856)
Podalonia luffii (E. Saunders, 1903)
Podalonia marismortui (Bytinski-Salz, 1955)
Podalonia mauritanica (Mercet, 1906)
Podalonia melaena Murray, 1940
Podalonia mexicana (de Saussure, 1867)
Podalonia mickeli Murray, 1940
Podalonia minax (Kohl, 1901)
Podalonia moczari (Tsuneki, 1971)
Podalonia montana (Cameron, 1888)
Podalonia nigrohirta (Kohl, 1888)
Podalonia occidentalis Murray, 1940
Podalonia parallela Murray, 1940
Podalonia parvula Li & Yang, 1992
Podalonia pilosa Li & Yang, 1995
Podalonia pubescens Murray, 1940
Podalonia pulawkii Dulfuss, 2010
Podalonia puncta Murray, 1940
Podalonia pungens (Kohl, 1901)
Podalonia robusta (Cresson, 1865)
Podalonia rothi (de Beaumont, 1951)
Podalonia schmiedeknechti (Kohl, 1898)
Podalonia sericea Murray, 1940
Podalonia sheffieldi (R. Turner, 1918)
Podalonia sonorensis (Cameron, 1888)
Podalonia tydei (Le Guillou, 1841)
Podalonia valida (Cresson, 1865)
Podalonia violaceipennis (Lepeletier de Saint Fargeau, 1845)
Podalonia yunnana Li & Yang, 1992

References

Sphecidae